Vladimir (Vlad) Conta (born 20 January 1954) is a Romanian conductor and pianist with an international career spanning 30 years. He was the Principal Conductor of the Regina Symphony Orchestra in Canada. He has been a Principal Conductor at the Romanian National Opera, Bucharest, since 2001.

He made his American debut in 1997 with pianist Radu Lupu and the National Symphony Orchestra in a series of concerts in Washington, DC. His London debut came in 2000, when he conducted the Philharmonia Orchestra in several concerts at the Royal Festival Hall featuring the Russian pianist Mikhail Pletnev.

Conta was born in Arad, Romania and is the son of the conductor Iosif Conta.

Early life 

Conta attended the George Enescu Music Academy of Bucharest, debuting at age 13 as a piano soloist with the National Radio Orchestra, conducted by his father and  Romanian conductor Iosif Conta. 
He received prizes at piano competitions in Europe and followed with studies at the Geneva Conservatoire de Musique of Switzerland.

He trained at the "Mozarteum" in Salzburg, Austria under pianist and conductor Carlo Zecchi. He studied at the Chigiana Music Academy in Sienna, Italy, with Italian conductor Franco Ferrara.

Career 

His conducting career started in Monte Carlo, Geneva and Torino and continued in Canada, the US and Romania. His repertoire included symphonic works, opera and ballet.

Conta has been conducting the National Opera of Bucharest since 2001, and at different opera houses and symphony orchestras in Romania and abroad. His career started as a coach at the Monte Carlo Opera and at the Grand Théâtre de Genève in Switzerland. The position of Kapellmeister at the State Theater in Biel- Bienne (Switzerland) followed, as well as that of principal guest conductor at Teatro Regio di Torino. 
Between 1989 and 1999 he took the position of Music Director and Conductor of the Regina Symphony, Canada’s oldest continuously performing orchestra.

His American debut came in 1997 with pianist Radu Lupu and the National Symphony Orchestra, in a series of concerts in Washington, DC.

IN 1997 in Moscow he conducted the National Russian Orchestra in a Beethoven/Berlioz program. In 2000, Conta made his London debut at the Royal Festival Hall, conducting the Philharmonia Orchestra in several concerts, with a program which included all Tchaikovsky’s piano works performed by Russian pianist Mikhail Pletnev.

In 2006 debuted in Rome, presenting a Bartok/Enescu/Beethoven program with the Orchestra di Roma e del Lazio.

After 1989, Conta repeatedly returned to Romania, including a dual role as a pianist and conductor leading the George Enescu Philharmonic in an all-Beethoven program (3d Symphony and the Fantasy in C minor for piano, chorus and orchestra).

Awards 
 The 125th Anniversary Medal of Canada for cultural merit  
 The Ludovic Spiess Prize awarded by the Romanian Musical Forum in 2011

References

Romanian conductors (music)
Male conductors (music)
Romanian classical pianists
People from Arad, Romania
1954 births
Living people
Jewish classical pianists
21st-century conductors (music)
21st-century classical pianists
21st-century male musicians